= Standard Wool =

Global wool supplier based in the UK

- Company type: Limited
- Industry: Wool
- Headquarters: Bradford, United Kingdom
- Services: Supplier
- Number of employees: 100–200
- Website: http://www.standardwool.co.uk

Standard Wool is a global group of companies which sources, processes and supplies quality wool and its by-products to its worldwide customer base. The company’s origins date back to the 18th century and they now have trading and sourcing facilities in the United Kingdom, Chile, China and New Zealand. The firm is headquartered in Bradford, West Yorkshire, United Kingdom.

== Background ==
Standard Wool is a multi-million pound group of five companies that together make up one of the world’s leading wool trading businesses. It has customer base spanning across 30 countries and specialises in sourcing, supplying and processing wools from the UK and overseas.

The company employs around 150 people across West Yorkshire and overseas locations including New Zealand, China and Chile.

In 2011, the company expanded its United Kingdom operations by moving to new headquarters in Bradford.

== Management buyout ==
In 2005, Managing Director Paul Hughes Snr led a buy-out of the company, which has a turnover exceeding £50m.

In 2014, the company made three key appointments to its group board. Paul Hughes Jr became group trading director, Mark Andrews was promoted to production director and Ian Marwood joined as a non-executive director.

== Company profiles ==
The Standard Wool group consists of five companies:

- Standard Wool (UK) Ltd.
- Standard Wool (Chile) SA
- Standard Wool (NZ)
- Standard Wool (Nanjing, China)
